Brora railway station is a railway station serving the small town of Brora in the Highland council area of Scotland. ScotRail, who manage the station, operate all services.

History 
The station opened on 19 June 1871, and was staffed from 1872 to 1992. The former station buildings are now unused but together with the cast iron footbridge are a listed building.

Facilities 

The station has basic facilities, including waiting shelters on both platforms, and a small car park and bike racks adjacent to platform 2. Both platforms have step-free access, but are also connected by a footbridge.

Passenger volume 

The statistics cover twelve month periods that start in April.

Services
There are four departures each weekday & Saturday, and one each way on a Sunday.

References

Bibliography 

Railway stations in Sutherland
Railway stations in Great Britain opened in 1871
Railway stations served by ScotRail
Former Highland Railway stations
Listed railway stations in Scotland
Category C listed buildings in Highland (council area)
William Roberts railway stations
Brora